Frederick IV (1382 – 24 June 1439), also known as Frederick of the Empty Pockets, a member of the House of Habsburg, was Duke of Austria from 1402 until his death. As a scion of the Habsburg Leopoldian line, he ruled over Further Austria and the County of Tyrol from 1406 onwards.

Biography
Frederick was the youngest son of Duke Leopold III (1351–1386) and his wife Viridis (d. 1414), a daughter of Bernabò Visconti, Lord of Milan. According to the 1379 Treaty of Neuberg, his father ruled over the Habsburg Inner Austrian territories of Styria, Carinthia, Carniola, as well as over Tyrol and the dynasty's original Further Austrian possessions in Swabia. After the early death of Duke Leopold in the 1386 Battle of Sempach, Frederick and his elder brothers William, Leopold IV and Ernest initially remained under the tutelage of their uncle Duke Albert III of Austria.

As an inheritance dispute arose upon Duke Albert's death in 1395, the young Leopoldian dukes insisted on their rights: the next year, William went on to rule the Inner Austrian lands and Leopold IV ascended as Count of Tyrol. When Frederick came of age in 1402, he was formally assigned to administrate his father's inheritance in the scattered Habsburg territories in Swabia, referred to collectively as Further Austria (Vorderösterreich) and took his residence in Freiburg im Breisgau. Another division of the Leopoldian territories took place after William' death in 1406: Duke Leopold IV, now eldest heir, ceded Tyrol to Frederick; however, he did not become sole ruler in Further Austria until Leopold's death in 1411. 

The early years of Frederick's reign were marked by external and internal conflicts. He had to overcome the opposition of Tyrolean nobles (who gave him the title "of the Empty Pockets") in 1406/1407 and a rebellion in the Bishopric of Trent. He also had to deal with the independence movement in the Swabian Appenzell lands, where the conflict with the Prince-Abbots of St Gall had escalated in 1401, sparking the Appenzell Wars. Frederick had to withstand in a series of longstanding military conflicts, until a peace was concluded in 1410. However, the Appenzell area became a protectorate of the Old Swiss Confederacy in 1411. Back in Tyrol, he had to face the invading forces of Duke Stephen III of Bavaria, whom he defeated in the Lower Inn Valley.

Upon the death of Duke Leopold IV in 1411, the surviving younger brothers Frederick and Ernest again divided the Leopoldian possessions. With Further Austria, Frederick became undisputed ruler over the Habsburg territories in the Alsace region and of the Burgau margraviate. In 1417 he also inherited the former Kyburg estates from the extinct comital Habsburg-Laufenburg branch. Several border conflicts with the Republic of Venice led to the loss of Rovereto in the Lagarina Valley.

Under the terms of the Western Schism, Duke Frederick sided with Antipope John XXIII, whom he helped on his flight from the Council of Constance in March 1415. The Luxembourg king Sigismund had John arrested in Breisgau and placed Frederick under the Imperial ban. Thanks to the support of the local populace he managed to keep Tyrol, though he lost the western Aargau, the Freiamt and County of Baden estates, in the old homeland of the Habsburgs, to the Swiss.

In 1420, Frederick also moved his Tyrolean court from Meran to Innsbruck. After several rebellions by local nobles, his rule over Tyrol had stabilized, partially due to the successful beginning of silver mining that brought an increase in prosperity to the region. After the death of his brother Ernest on 10 June 1424, Duke Frederick also took over the regency over Inner Austria for his minor nephews Frederick V (the later Emperor Frederick III) and Albert VI. In his later years, however, he again had to cope with another rebellion against his Tyrolean rule, instigated by Prince-Bishop Alexander of Trent.

Frederick died at his court in Innsbruck, despite his nickname a rich man. His son and heir Sigismund was called der Münzreiche ("Rich in Coin"). Frederick was buried in the Cistercian abbey of Stams, Tyrol.

Marriage and issue
On 24 December 1407, Frederick married Elizabeth of the Palatinate (1381–1408), daughter of King Rupert of Germany, in Innsbruck. They had one daughter, Elizabeth, but both mother and child died shortly after the birth on 27 December 1408.

On 11 June 1411, Frederick married Anna (d. 1432), daughter of the Welf duke Frederick I of Brunswick-Wolfenbüttel; they had:
 Margaret (14231424)
 Hedwig (14241427)
 Wolfgang (1426)
 Sigismund (14271496).
Only Sigismund survived until adulthood. He succeeded his father in Tyrol and Further Austria.

Ancestors

References

Sources

External links 
Encyclopedia of Austria

Austria, Friedrich IV of
Austria, Friedrich IV of
15th-century dukes of Austria
Counts of Tyrol